Joan Hinde Stewart (born 1944) is an American academic administrator who served as the 19th president of Hamilton College in Clinton, New York from 2003 to 2016.

Early life and education 
Stewart was born and raised in Brooklyn, New York. After earning a Bachelor of Arts degree, summa cum laude, from St. Joseph's College in 1965, Stewart earned a Ph.D. in French from Yale University in 1970.

Career 
Stewart taught French and was Dean of the College of Liberal Arts at the University of South Carolina from 1999-2003, before assuming the presidency of Hamilton College. Before the University of South Carolina, Stewart taught French at North Carolina State University from 1973 to 1999 and served as Chair of the Department of Foreign Languages from 1985 to 1997. Since 2015, Stewart has served as a trustee of the National Humanities Center in Research Triangle Park. Stewart has served as a member of the president's council of the University of the People.

Stewart retired as president of Hamilton College in 2016, and was succeeded by legal scholar, David Wippman.

Personal life 
Stewart is married to Philip Stewart, who retired in 2008 from Duke University, where he was the Benjamin E. Powell Professor of Romance Studies. The couple has two grown children.

References

Living people
1943 births
Hamilton College (New York) faculty
St. Joseph's College (New York) alumni
Yale University alumni
University of the People people